HMAS Hawk (M 1139) (formerly HMS Somerlyton) was a  operated by the Royal Navy and the Royal Australian Navy (RAN). The minesweeper was built for the Royal Navy as HMS Gamston, but renamed HMS Somerlyton before entering service. She was sold to Australia in 1961, and commissioned as HMAS Hawk in 1962. The ship operated through the Indonesia-Malaysia Confrontation, and was decommissioned in 1972.

Construction
The minesweeper was laid down for the Royal Navy by Richards Ironworks at Lowestoft, England. She was launched on 1 July 1954 as HMS Gamston, but was renamed HMS Somerlyton before entering service.

Operational history

Australia
The ship was purchased by Australia in 1961 and commissioned into the RAN as HMAS Hawk on 18 July 1962.

Hawk was one of several Australian warships deployed to Malaysia to protect the nation during the Indonesia-Malaysia Confrontation. She became the second Australian minesweeper to see action during the Confrontation on 13 March 1966, when she came under fire from an Indonesian shore battery while patrolling off Raffles Light. Eleven high explosive rounds were fired at the ship, some landing within  of the vessel, before Hawk withdrew from the area at speed. The following morning, Hawk intercepted a sampan and arrested the five Indonesians on board. The minesweeper's service during Confrontation was later recognised with the battle honour "Malaysia 1964–66".

Decommissioning and fate
HMAS Hawk paid off on 7 January 1972.

References

Ton-class minesweepers of the Royal Navy
Ships built in Lowestoft
1954 ships
Cold War minesweepers of the United Kingdom
Ton-class minesweepers of the Royal Australian Navy
Cold War minesweepers of Australia